Miles Davis & John Coltrane The Final Tour is a four compact disc live album compiling five sets from three locations of performances by the Miles Davis Quintet in Europe during late March 1960. The anthology was released by Legacy in 2018 and topped the Billboard Jazz Albums chart.

Background
The concerts derive from a three-week European tour undertaken by the Davis band as part of a Jazz at the Philharmonic presentation as organized by promoter Norman Granz, which also included Stan Getz and Oscar Peterson as headliners.

Track listing

Personnel
 Miles Davis – trumpet
 John Coltrane – tenor saxophone
 Wynton Kelly – piano
 Paul Chambers – double bass
 Jimmy Cobb – drums

References

2015 live albums
Miles Davis live albums
Albums produced by Michael Cuscuna
Albums recorded at the Newport Jazz Festival
John Coltrane live albums